Rail transport modelling uses a variety of scales (ratio between the real world and the model) to ensure scale models look correct when placed next to each other. Model railway scales are standardized worldwide by many organizations and hobbyist groups. Some of the scales are recognized globally, while others are less widespread and, in many cases, virtually unknown outside their circle of origin. Scales may be expressed as a numeric ratio (e.g. 1/87 or 1:87) or as letters defined in rail transport modelling standards (e.g. HO, OO, N, O, G, TT and Z.) The majority of commercial model railway equipment manufacturers base their offerings on Normen Europäischer Modellbahnen (NEM) or National Model Railroad Association (NMRA) standards in most popular scales.

Terminology
Although scale and gauge are often confused, scale means the ratio between a unit of measurement on a model compared with a unit of measurement in corresponding full size prototype, while gauge is the distance between the two running rails of the track. About 60% of the world's railways have a track gauge of  known as "standard gauge", but there are also narrow-gauge railways where the track gauge is less than standard and broad-gauge railways where the gauge is wider. In a similar manner, a scale model railway may have several track gauges in one scale.

In addition to the scale and gauge issue, rail transport modelling standards are also applied to other attributes such as catenary, rolling stock wheel profile, loading gauge, curve radii and grades for slopes, to ensure interoperation of scale models produced by different manufacturers. Globally, the two dominating standard organizations are NMRA in North America and MOROP in Europe with their NEM standard.

History of scale standards

The first model railways were not built to any particular scale and were more like toys than miniature representations of the full size prototype. Eventually, the authenticity of models grew, and benefits of standardization became more obvious. The most significant and the most basic area of standardization was the model track gauge. At first, certain gauges became de facto standards in hobbyist and manufacturer circles. While the first unofficial standard gauges made interchangeability possible, the rolling stock were still only a rough approximation of the full-scale prototype.

Eventually the unofficial or manufacturer specific scale standards became more established and were adopted by various model railway standardization bodies such as NMRA and MOROP. However, they were very often poorly implemented in design and manufacturing processes with commercial manufacturers before the World War II. The conformity to scale standards grew strongly in the 1950s and 1960s when many new model railway accessories manufacturers were born and to whom the standard conformity was vital.

For most standardized model railway scales, the nominal scale reduction ratio is not applied systematically to all the components of a scale model railway, and normally the standards give scale specific design guidelines for all the scales they cover. Reliability of operations requires that certain parts be made oversize. A typical example is the wheel flanges, which must be proportionally higher in smaller scales to ensure that lighter and smaller models do not derail easily as they would if universal flange proportions were used in all the scales. For instance, a Z scale wheel flange as defined in the NEM standard should be about 9% of the scale nominal standard gauge, whereas the same standard gives only 5% for  standard gauge I scale.

While standards that put the emphasis on operational reliability satisfy most users and the industry, certain groups of dedicated hobby modellers who were dissatisfied with the scale inaccuracies in the name of reliability have developed alternative scale standards where prototype proportions are maintained to the extent possible. These alternative standards are called finescale standards. Finescale standards are very much restricted to discerning hobbyists since, by definition, finescale model railways are generally less reliable and more expensive to manufacture, which makes them unsuitable for mass-production products.

One limitation with smaller scales is that the small size of the metal contacts means it is easier for dust and dirty track to interfere with the electrical circuit needed to drive the train. Moreover, the tight tolerances also mean friction can more easily interfere with the train moving. One approach to enable further miniaturization beyond T Scale is the recent commercial introduction of linear drive motors. The magnetic propulsion eliminates moving parts, simplifying motion and models. Commercially available scales using linear propulsion drive range from 1:655 to 1:1000.

Mixing of scales
It is possible to use different scales of models together effectively, especially to create a false sense of depth (referred to as "forced perspective"). Scales close to each other are also hard to tell apart with the naked eye. An onlooker seeing a 1:43 model car next to a 1:48 scale model train would probably not notice the difference.

Some common examples of mixing scales are:
 a foreshortening technique using N scale (1:160) model trains in the background (distance) with HO scale (1:87) in the foreground.
 mixing 1:43 scale, 1:48 scale and 1:50 scale die-cast models with O scale model trains.
 using Matchbox cars (1:64 to 1:100) with HO scale and S scale.
 mixing OO scale British model trains with HO scale models. Both scales run on the same track but OO is slightly larger in scale.
 using 1:144 scale die-cast models with N scale.

Scales

See also

 Rail transport modelling
 List of scale model sizes
 The Museum of the Moscow Railway
 List of narrow-gauge model railway scales

References

External links

 http://www.spikesys.com/Modelrr/scales.html – Contains more specifics about some of the scales
 https://dfarq.homeip.net/sizes-of-model-trains/ – Contains photos of human hand comparison to each scale
 http://modeltrains.about.com – Online resource for model railroaders
 The Gauge One Model Railway Association
 The Gauge 3 Society
 Mundo Ferroviario, Web portal dedicated to a modelling in HO scale (Spanish).

Scale model scales
ja:鉄道模型のゲージ